Impressions of New York is an album by German jazz clarinetist Rolf Kühn and his brother, pianist Joachim Kühn, featuring performances recorded in 1967 for the Impulse! label.

Reception
The Allmusic review by Scott Yanow stated: "The music flows with a strong momentum, never losing one's interest. Rolf Kuhn easily keeps up with his younger sidemen, and the overall results feature strong development and some surprises. Recommended".

Track listing
All compositions by Rolf Kühn
 "Impressions Of New York - I: Arrival / The Saddest Day / Reality" - 17:50
 "Impressions Of New York - II: Predictions" - 15:15
Recorded in New York City in 1967

Personnel
Rolf Kühn – clarinet
Joachim Kühn – piano
Jimmy Garrison – double bass
Aldo Romano – drums

References

Impulse! Records albums
Rolf Kühn albums
1967 albums
Albums produced by Bob Thiele
Joachim Kühn albums